Refund Home Loans was an Australian mortgage services company founded by Wayne Ormond in 2004. The company created a franchised network of remote working mortgage brokers. After issues with the regulator for breaching trading practices in 2009 it got into financial difficulties. In October 2011, the business went into administration and in June 2012, its assets were sold to rival Australian mortgage company Homeloans Ltd.

History
The company was founded by Wayne Ormond in April 2004 as a mortgage broking service. In December 2004, it was raised in the House of Representatives that Westpac, Commopnwealth, St George and ANZ banks did not approve of Refund Home Loans sharing their commission with customers, and refused to do business with Refund. This matter was taken to the Australian Competition & Consumer Commission (ACCC)

It expanded its business and by 2008 had over 350 franchisees nationally in every state and territory of Australia. It also expanded into other services including financial planning, Finance & Leasing, Property Investment and real estate. The company and its chairman received acknowledgement for the company growth between 2008 and 2010.

By 2009 the company had head office staff of more than 40 who provide support for the company’s Australia-wide network of work-from-home franchisees, mortgage brokers. It had access to a panel of over 30 lenders and was independent of the major banks.

In October 2009, the ACCC commenced proceedings against the company over accusations it breached the Trade Practices Act. In October 2011, the company was placed in administration after not being able to meet its debts. and in June 2012 the company assets and network of brokers was sold to Homeloans Ltd another Australian home loan company.

References

Financial services companies of Australia
Mortgage industry of Australia